Sky Devils, also known as Ground Hogs, is a 1932 American Pre-Code aviation comedy film, starring Spencer Tracy as a draft dodger who blunders into a war zone.

Sky Devils was partly written by humorist Robert Benchley and the picture's director A. Edward Sutherland from a story by Sutherland. The film features Ann Dvorak in a supporting role.

Plot
In 1917, lifeguards Wilkie (Spencer Tracy) and Mitchell (George Cooper) who can not even swim, are trying to keep out of the war. When a man is drowning, U.S. Army Air Corps Sergeant Hogan (William Boyd) rescues the drowning man but they are quick to claim credit.

When the pair go to a Red Cross benefit boxing match, they again encounter the sergeant, billed as "One Punch" Hogan but Wilkie surprisingly knocks him out, before sneaking out with Mitchell, as a crowd gathers. The two friends swear they will never join the Army, but relent and later wind up in uniform, shovelling manure. Determined to find a way out, Wilkie and Mitchell desert and head off to South America, hopping in a manure truck leaving the base.

After stowing away on a ship, they find out they are on a troop ship with Army Air Corps pilots going to France. Wilkie and Mitchell pretend they want to fly and are sent to train at an American aviation field. Doing their best to not become pilots, while on guard duty, Wilkie competes with Sgt. Hogan for the attentions of Fifi (Yola d'Avril), a French performer. After a dustup at a nightclub, the two rivals make a quick exit, hiding in a car driven by Mary Way (Ann Dvorak). Startled by the men, she crashes, but all are unharmed. Wilkie and Hogan escort her to an inn for the evening. In the morning, Wilkie has breakfast with Mary and cons Hogan into fixing her car.

Military police looking for the two and come and arrest them, as well as Mary thought to be a spy. Wilkie, Hogan and Mary escape in an aircraft, but land in enemy territory and are captured. Accidentally releasing two bombs, they bomb a German munitions depot. The Air Corps colonel (Billy Bevan) sends a squadron to rescue the trio, with Mitchell scaring the Germans by his inept maneuvers.

After their rescue, the three heroes fly home but Wilkie again accidentally pulls the lever for the bomb release, this time bombing his own base.

Cast

 Spencer Tracy as Wilkie
 William Boyd as Sgt Hogan
 George Cooper as Mitchell
 Ann Dvorak as Mary Way
 Billy Bevan as the Colonel
 Yola d'Avril as Fifi
 Forrester Harvey as Innkeeper
 William B. Davidson as Captain
 Jerry Miley as Lieutenant

Production

Filming

Principal photography for Sky Devils took place first from May 9 to June 12, 1931, with additional sequences shot from September 2 to early October 1931. The locations for the production included: U.S. Army Air Corps March Field, San Pedro and Venice, California, along with Yuma, Arizona.

In order to recoup some of the investment made in Hell's Angels (1930), Howard Hughes decided to recycle some of the sequences and unused footage for a pair of comedies set in the air, Cock of the Air (1932) and the Sky Devils.  "The picture contained parts of the dogfight and ammunition bombing sequences ..."  The remaining aircraft from the earlier films, a total of 14 World War I-era  and later aircraft, were assembled at the Metropolitan Airport in Van Nuys, California.

Reception
Reviewer Mordaunt Hall at The New York Times, described the film as "... a boisterous affair, in which even the familiar mud-hole in the water is employed to arouse laughter. Yet, Mr. Boyd as Sergeant Hogan and Mr. Tracy as Private Wilkie attack their rôles with undeniable vigor. Many punches are exchanged and when that sort of thing gets tame a few bottles and glasses are broken, which is followed by automobile smash-ups and airplane crashes. Added to this there is the quasi-romantic side of the adventure, with Yola d'Avril and Ann Dvorak contributing their feminine wiles."

Aviation film historians Hardwick and Schnepf, however, noted that Sky Devils was an example where "Howard Hughes figured he had made such a score with 'Hell's Angels', he'd try it again with much of the same aerial footage and new stars. It bombed."

References

Notes

Citations

Bibliography

 Hardwick, Jack and Ed Schnepf. "A Buff's Guide to Aviation Movies". Air Progress Aviation, Vol. 7, No. 1, Spring 1983.
 Orriss, Bruce W. When Hollywood Ruled the Skies: The Aviation Film Classics of World War I. Los Angeles: Aero Associates, 2013. .
 Paris, Michael. From the Wright Brothers to Top Gun: Aviation, Nationalism, and Popular Cinema. Manchester, UK: Manchester University Press, 1995. . 
 Pendo, Stephen. Aviation in the Cinema. Lanham, Maryland: Scarecrow Press, 1985. .

External links
 
 

Films directed by A. Edward Sutherland
1932 films
1932 comedy films
American aviation films
American comedy films
Films produced by Howard Hughes
American black-and-white films
1930s American films